As of 2022, there are 588 National Wildlife Refuges in the United States, with the addition of the Green River National Wildlife Refuge. Refuges that have boundaries in multiple states are listed only in the state where the main visitor entrance is located. The newest refuge replaces the Cherry Valley National Wildlife Refuge in Pennsylvania. Refuges are listed whether or not they are open to the public. Many are not.

The United States is divided into eight regions for administrative purposes:



Alabama

Alaska

American Samoa

Arizona

Arkansas

California

Colorado

Connecticut

Delaware

District of Columbia 
 None

Florida

Georgia 
 
 (*) - Refuge is part of the Savannah Coastal Refuges Complex.

Guam

Hawaiʻi

Idaho 
 
 (*) - Refuge is part of the Southeast Idaho National Wildlife Refuge Complex.

Illinois 
 
 See also: Mark Twain National Wildlife Refuge Complex

Indiana

Iowa

Kansas

Kentucky

Louisiana

Maine 

 (*) - part of Maine Coastal Islands National Wildlife Refuge.

Maryland 

 (*) - part of Chesapeake Marshlands National Wildlife Refuge Complex.

Massachusetts

Michigan

Minnesota

Mississippi

Missouri

Montana

Nebraska

Nevada 

 (^) = managed as part of the Desert National Wildlife Refuge Complex, headquartered in Las Vegas
 (^^) = managed as part of the Sheldon-Hart Mountain National Wildlife Refuge Complex, headquartered in Lakeview, Oregon

New Hampshire

New Jersey

New Mexico

New York 

 (*) = Refuge is part of the Long Island National Wildlife Refuge Complex.

North Carolina 

 (^) = Refuge is part of the North Carolina Coastal Plain National Wildlife Refuge Complex
 (^^) = Refuge is part of the Mattamuskeet, Swanquarter and Cedar Island National Wildlife Refuge Complex

North Dakota 

(^) = managed by the Arrowwood National Wildlife Refuge Complex
(^^) = managed by the Audubon National Wildlife Refuge Complex
(^^^) = managed by the Devils Lake Wetland Management District
(^^^^) = managed by the J. Clark Salyer National Wildlife Refuge Complex
(^^^^^) = managed by the Long Lake National Wildlife Refuge Complex
(^^^^^^) = managed by the Lostwood Wetland Management District Complex
(^^^^^^^) = managed by the Souris River Basin National Wildlife Refuge Complex
(^^^^^^^^) = managed by the Tewaukon National Wildlife Refuge Complex

Northern Mariana Islands 
 None

Ohio 

 (^) = managed by the Ottawa National Wildlife Refuge Complex

Oklahoma

Oregon 

See also:
Klamath Basin National Wildlife Refuges Complex (CA and OR)
Mid-Columbia River National Wildlife Refuge Complex
Oregon Coast National Wildlife Refuge Complex
Sheldon-Hart Mountain National Wildlife Refuge Complex (NV and OR)
Willamette Valley National Wildlife Refuge Complex

Pennsylvania

Puerto Rico 

All National Wildlife Refuges in Puerto Rico are managed by the Caribbean Islands National Wildlife complex

Rhode Island 

All National Wildlife Refuges in Rhode Island are managed by the Rhode Island National Wildlife Refuge Complex

South Carolina 

 (^) = Refuge is part of the South Carolina Lowcountry National Wildlife Refuge Complex.
 (^^) = Refuge is part of the Savannah Coastal Refuges Complex, administered in Georgia.

South Dakota

Tennessee 

 (^) = managed as part of the West Tennessee National Wildlife Refuge Complex.

Texas

U.S. Minor Outlying Islands 

 Caribbean Islands National Wildlife Refuge Complex (in PR, the UM and VI)
 Navassa Island National Wildlife Refuge
 Managed under the Hawaiian Islands National Wildlife Refuge (in Hawaii)
 Midway Atoll National Wildlife Refuge
 United States Pacific Island Wildlife Refuges (in the UM)
 Baker Island National Wildlife Refuge
 Howland Island National Wildlife Refuge
 Jarvis Island National Wildlife Refuge
 Johnston Atoll National Wildlife Refuge
 Kingman Reef National Wildlife Refuge
 Palmyra Atoll National Wildlife Refuge
 Wake Atoll National Wildlife Refuge

Utah

Vermont

Virgin Islands (U.S.) 

National Wildlife Refuges in the U.S. Virgin Islands are managed by the Caribbean Islands National Wildlife complex.

Virginia 

 (^) = Refuge a part of the Eastern Virginia Rivers National Wildlife Refuge Complex.
 (^^) = Refuge a part of the Potomac River National Wildlife Refuge Complex.

Washington 

(^) = Refuge a part of the Washington Maritime National Wildlife Refuge Complex.

West Virginia

Wisconsin

Wyoming

See also

 List of largest National Wildlife Refuges 
 Washington Maritime National Wildlife Refuge Complex

References

External links 

 US Fish and Wildlife Service list of National Wildlife Refuges

Wildlife Refuge, List
National Wildlife Refuges